A-Love is a female Australian-based MC from Melbourne. Her debut album, Ace of Hearts was nominated 'Best Urban Release' in the ARIA Music Awards of 2008.

Biography
A-Love was born Antonella Formosa in Rome, Italy on 21 March 1983.  Formosa's father is Ric Formosa, a composer/arranger and an original member (lead guitarist) with the Australian band Little River Band and her mother, Vicki Formosa, was an R&B singer.
She attended Hawthorn Secondary College, graduating in 1999. Whilst her first experiences of playing music were with an all-female band, which never made any public performances, she also discovered hip hop in high school and soon found herself waxing lyrical over beats.

In January 2000, Formosa met Draino from the Puah Hedz.  He was keen to check out her writing and despite her reluctance, he made her feature on a track. The second track that she had ever recorded was with Muphin, which later became "Some People" which featured on the album Despite the Odds. She has since appeared numerous times on Triple J's 'The Hip Hop Show', PBS' 'The Formula' (now 'Hittin Switches') and 'Auscultation', RRR's 'Wordburner' and RMIT University's SRA FM.  She was progressing towards a Bachelor of Arts degree in Anthropology from La Trobe University and for two years she was the co-host of a hip hop radio show at La Trobe University.

May 2002 marked A-Love's official solo introduction to the Australian hip hop and media circles, with her song "Petty" from the album, Culture of Kings Volume 2 (the first ever Australian hip hop feature album on Triple J).  "Petty" was put on medium rotation on Triple J.

Formosa was a winner of the Nescafe Big Break competition in 2002, earning $20,000 with which to start up an independent record label and distribution company, Duality Records. As time progressed, she juggled the twin responsibilities of building a label and working on her own debut as an artist.

Formosa released her debut album, Ace of Hearts on 24 November 2007, on Crookneck Records.  The album was produced by BVA (Mnemonic Ascent) with additional beats from Suffa (Hilltop Hoods) and Jase. Guests include Yungun (UK), Raph (Mnemonic Ascent), Spikey Tee (UK) and emerging indigenous MC Jim Blah.  It was Triple J's 'Album of the Week' just three days after its release and was nominated for the 2008 ARIA Awards in the category of 'Best Urban Release'.

She was also nominated for two at the Jägermeister AIR (Australian Independent Record Labels Association) Awards in 2008, in the categories of 'Best New Independent Artist' and 'Best Independent Hip Hop Artist'.

Formosa has performed with Mystik Journeymen (US), Anticon, Hilltop Hoods, Pegz, MC Layla, Kowhai, Bliss n Eso, Scarz on 45, MC Que, TZU, Bias B and DJ Brand (Canada).

Awards

AIR Awards
The Australian Independent Record Awards (commonly known informally as AIR Awards) is an annual awards night to recognise, promote and celebrate the success of Australia's Independent Music sector.

|-
| rowspan="2" | 2008
| A-Love 
| Best New Independent Artist
| 
|-
| Ace of Hearts
| Best Independent Hip Hop Album
| 
|-

Discography

Albums
 Ace of Hearts – Crookneck Records/Shogun Distribution (November 2007)

Contributions
 Get The Picture? – Draino ("Out of Place") – Puah Head Constructions (2000)
 Despite the Odds – ("Some People") – Puah Head Constructions (2000)
 Culture of Kings – Volume 2 ("Petty") – Obese Records (2002)
 Obesecity – ("Rapunzal") – Obese Records (2002)
 Straight from the Art... – ("Movin'") – Warner Music (2003)
 Straight from the Art 2 – ("Captains of...") – Warner Music (2004)
 The Enthusiast – Evil Ed ("Captains of...") – Janomi (2004)
 Beat the Hedz Vol 1 – Jase ("Sincerely Yours") – Obese Records (2006)
 Diggi Down Unda – Mystro ("The Beaches") – Grindin Records (2006)
 Good Vibrations 2008 – ("So Easy") – Universal Music (2008)

References

External links

 The Age review of Ace of Hearts (22 November 2007)
 Triple J album review
 Triple J Next Crop Artist Profile (2003)
 Duality Records
 Planet Urban album review
 PBS article

1983 births
Living people
Australian hip hop musicians
Australian women rappers
Obese Records artists
Rappers from Melbourne
Musicians from Rome
Australian expatriates in Italy